Evgeniya Sergeyevna Augustinas (née Romanyuta; born 22 January 1988 in Tula) is a Russian professional racing cyclist, who last rode for UCI Women's Team .

Major results

Track

2005
 2nd Scratch, UEC European Junior Championships
 3rd Scratch, UCI Junior World Championships

2006
 UEC European Junior Championships
2nd Points race
3rd Scratch
 UCI Junior World Championships
3rd Points race
3rd Scratch

2007
 2007–08 UCI World Cup Classics
1st Team pursuit, Sydney
2nd Team pursuit, Beijing

2008
 2008–09 UCI World Cup Classics
1st Points race, Melbourne
3rd Scratch, Melbourne
 2nd Scratch, 2007–08 UCI World Cup Classics, Los Angeles
 UEC European Under-23 Championships
3rd  Scratch Race
3rd  Team Pursuit (with Oxana Kozonchuk, Maria Mishina and Victoria Kondel)

2009
 2008–09 UCI World Cup Classics
1st Scratch, Beijing
3rd Team pursuit, Beijing
 2009–10 UCI World Cup Classics
1st Scratch, Melbourne
2nd Scratch, Manchester
3rd Points race, Manchester
3rd  Scratch race, UEC European Under-23 Championships

2010
 3rd Scratch, 2009–10 UCI World Cup Classics, Beijing
 3rd Scratch, UEC European Under-23 Championships

2011
 1st Points race, UEC European Championships
 1st Omnium, 2011–12 UCI World Cup, Astana

2012
 1st Omnium, 2011–12 UCI World Cup, Beijing
 5th Omnium, UCI World Championships

2013
 3rd Points race, UCI World Championships

2014
 UEC European Championships
1st Scratch
2nd  Team pursuit (with Tamara Balabolina, Alexandra Chekina, Aleksandra Goncharova and Irina Molicheva)
 Memorial of Alexander Lesnikov
1st Individual pursuit
1st Points race
 Grand Prix of Poland
1st Omnium
1st Scratch

2015
 1st Omnium, GP Prostejov – Memorial of Otmar Malecek 
Memorial of Alexander Lesnikov
2nd Omnium
3rd Scratch

2016
 1st Scratch, Panevežys 
 2nd Points race, GP Prostejov – Memorial of Otmar Malecek
 3rd Scratch, 2016–17 UCI World Cup, Glasgow

2017
 International race – Panevežys
1st Omnium
2nd Points Race
UEC European Championships
2nd Elimination Race
3rd Scratch Race

2018
 2nd Omnium, Six Days of Bremen

Road

2012
 4th Road race, National Road Championships

2013
 4th Team time trial, UCI World Championships

2018
 1st Stage 1 (TTT) The Princess Maha Chackri Sirindhon's Cup

References

External links

1988 births
Living people
Sportspeople from Tula, Russia
Russian female cyclists
Russian track cyclists
Cyclists at the 2012 Summer Olympics
Olympic cyclists of Russia
Cyclists at the 2019 European Games
European Games medalists in cycling
European Games silver medalists for Russia